Sauropleura (meaning "lizard side") is an extinct genus of nectridean lepospondyls within the family Urocordylidae. Fossils are known from the United States (Texas, Ohio) and Europe (Czech Republic). The following species are included:
 Sauropleura bairdi
 Sauropleura longicaudata
 Sauropleura pectinata
 Sauropleura scalaris

See also
 Prehistoric amphibian
 List of prehistoric amphibians

References

Holospondyls
Prehistoric amphibians of North America
Carboniferous amphibians
Taxa named by Edward Drinker Cope
Fossil taxa described in 1868